Iceland first established a permanent representation to the United States in October of 1940, following Thor Thors appointment as ambassador. Prior to 1940, Iceland was represented in the United States by Denmark.

List of ambassadors

See also
Iceland–United States relations
Foreign relations of Iceland
Ambassadors of Iceland

References
List of Icelandic representatives (Icelandic Foreign Ministry website) 
Office of the Historian: 

1941 establishments
Main
United States
Iceland